Rudnia (Russian and Belarusian: Рудня) is a village in  the southwest of Brest Raion, Brest Voblast, Belarus. It is part of Domachevsky possoviet.

It is situated by the Kopajowka River (Копаювка, Kopayuvka).

References

Villages in Belarus
Populated places in Brest Region